Philippa Pullar (12 February 1935, in London – 7 September 1997 in London) was a British author and jet set personality best remembered for her exhaustively researched 1975 biography of the Irish-American author Frank Harris. The biography involved great amounts of traveling and research, not least because Harris had intricately woven fact and fiction in his famous five-volume autobiography, My Life and Loves.

Born Philippa King, she was daughter of an army major. She married Robert Pullar in 1958 and they had two sons. The marriage did not last and was dissolved before he died in 1996. 

In later years Pullar became known as a devotee of New Age thought and prior to her death from cancer advocated various methods of natural and alternative healing.

Pullar had an extraordinary relationship with Michael Holroyd (before he married author Margaret Drabble), which Holroyd described in his memoir Mosaic, published after her death.

Books by Philippa Pullar

Consuming Passions: A History of English Food and Appetite. Dedicated "to Michael with my love" - 1970

Frank Harris - 1975

Gilded butterflies: The Rise and Fall of the London Season - 1978

Special Friends - 1979

The Shortest Journey - 1984 - 

To the Light - 1985

Spiritual and Lay Healing - 1988

(with Lilla Beck) Healing with Chakra Energy: Restoring the Natural Harmony of the Body - 1994

External links
Sunday Herald's review of Holroyd's Mosaic
Time Magazine review of Pullar's Consuming Passions
A review of Pullar's biography of Frank Harris
A brief sketch of some of Pullar's life and work

1935 births
1997 deaths